Quacula is an animated cartoon character, an anthropomorphic vampire duck, created by Filmation. He starred in his own segment on The New Adventures of Mighty Mouse and Heckle & Jeckle for one season.

Plot
Quacula (voiced by Frank Welker) was depicted as a pale blue duck with a Daffy Duck-like bill and fangs, dressed in a blue jacket and a black cape with a red lining. He slept by day in a white coffin shaped like an egg, in the basement of a house owned by an anthropomorphic bear named Theodore (voiced by Norm Prescott imitating Joe E. Ross of Car 54, Where Are You?).

Every night Quacula would rise from his coffin and try to terrify Theodore and others, but he would never really succeed; his antics tended to be more comical than frightening. Also, Theodore would come up with one plan after another to rid himself of Quacula, but always fail to do so.

Composer Ray Ellis occasionally repeated music cues from Groovie Goolies.

Broadcast history
Quacula made his debut on September 8, 1979, on the first episode of The New Adventures of Mighty Mouse and Heckle & Jeckle. However, cartoonist Scott Shaw filed suit against Filmation due to the fact that he had created a character named Duckula for the comic book Quack! #1 (July 1976),  published by Star*Reach. The matter was settled out of court, and after 16 episodes Quacula was dropped from the show, which was shortened from an hour to a half-hour .

List of cartoons
In addition to their own shorts, Quacula and Theodore also crossed over into Heckle & Jeckle's "Where There's a Will." The magpies show up after inheriting their uncle's mansion, and although Theodore instantly realizes they have the wrong address, he decides to give Heckle & Jeckle a night in the house, hoping they'll drive Quacula away.

References

External links
 Cartoon index at the Big Cartoon DataBase

Fictional ducks
Fictional vampires
Terrytoons characters
Male characters in animation
Television characters introduced in 1979
Vampires in animated television